Ludwik Je̜drzej Gorzkowski (1811–1857) was a Polish politician, physicist and revolutionary activist, one of the organizers of the Kraków uprising, during which he was a member of the newly formed Polish National Government alongside Jan Tyssowski and .

Life
Gorzkowski was born  in Kraków. He studied mathematics and physics at the University of Kraków and received his doctorate in 1835.

He co-authored the plan of the Kraków uprising in 1846 and the project of the composition of the provisional Polish National Government, in which he was to represent the Free City of Cracow.

References

1811 births
1857 deaths
19th-century Polish politicians
Date of death missing
Place of death missing
19th-century Polish physicists
Polish revolutionaries
Politicians from Kraków